George Vere Arundel Monckton-Arundell, 8th Viscount Galway,  (24 March 1882 – 27 March 1943) was a British politician. He served as the fifth Governor-General of New Zealand from 1935 to 1941.

Early life and family

George Vere Arundell Monckton-Arundell Galway was born on 24 March 1882. His parents were George Monckton-Arundell, 7th Viscount Galway and Vere Gosling. He had one sibling: Violet Frances Monckton-Arundell (14 May 1880 – 24 October 1930). He received his education at a preparatory school in Berkshire before attending Eton College (1895–1900) and Christ Church College, University of Oxford (1900–1904). He read Modern History and graduated with Bachelor of Arts and took the Master of Arts subsequently (this degree at Oxford, Cambridge and Dublin is an elevation in rank and not a postgraduate qualification).

Viscount Galway married Lucia Margaret White, daughter of the 3rd Baron Annaly, in 1922. They had four children: Mary Victoria Monckton (born 1924), Celia Ella Vere Monckton (1925–1997), Isabel Cynthia Monckton (born 1926) and Simon George Robert Monckton-Arundell (1929–1971).

Viscount Galway succeeded his father to the family's Irish peerage in 1931.

Military career
Monckton-Arundell was commissioned a second lieutenant in the Nottinghamshire (Sherwood Rangers) Yeomanry on 1 January 1900, and promoted to lieutenant on 11 June 1902. In 1904, he joined the First Life Guards, the senior regiment of the British Army that makes up the Household Cavalry, where he rose to the rank of colonel. During the First World War he was appointed as adjutant general and quartermaster general. He was of the Royal Artillery (1933–35). In 1933 he was appointed Colonel Commandant of the Honourable Artillery Company (HAC) until 1935, when he relinquished it on appointment as Governor-General of New Zealand. Upon retirement from his post as governor-general he returned as Colonel Commandant of the HAC until his death. He was also appointed Honorary Colonel of the 7th (Robin Hood) Battalion, Sherwood Foresters (later 42nd (The Robin Hoods, Sherwood Foresters) Anti-Aircraft Battalion, Royal Engineers) in 1933.

Political ambitions
In 1910, Monckton-Arundell attempted to follow his father into the House of Commons. He contested the Scarborough constituency in the January and December elections of 1910, but was unsuccessful both times.

Governor-General of New Zealand
Viscount Galway was Governor-General of New Zealand from 12 April 1935 to 3 February 1941. His military background made an impression with cabinet ministers of the time. His term was twice extended because of the Second World War. Viscount Galway and his wife received numerous gifts during his time as governor-general. Some were returned to New Zealand around the time of the sale of the family house Serlby Hall, and were donated to the Museum of New Zealand Te Papa Tongarewa in 1980.

Galway was a freemason. During his term as governor-general, he was also Grand Master of the Grand Lodge of New Zealand. In the 1937 Coronation Honours, he was appointed a member of the Privy Council.

Later years and death
Upon his return to England, Galway held the honorary post of Deputy Lord Lieutenant of Nottinghamshire under the 7th Duke of Portland. He died suddenly on 27 March 1943 in Blyth.

Arms

References

External links

 Short biography by the office of the Governor-General

 
|-

1882 births
1943 deaths
Alumni of Christ Church, Oxford
Governors-General of New Zealand
Viscounts in the Peerage of Ireland
Knights Grand Cross of the Order of St Michael and St George
Officers of the Order of the British Empire
British Life Guards officers
Deputy Lieutenants of Nottinghamshire
Companions of the Distinguished Service Order
New Zealand Freemasons
Members of the Privy Council of the United Kingdom